Low Moor F.C. was an English association football club, from Clitheroe, Lancashire.  The club was sometimes called Clitheroe Low Moor or Low Moor (Clitheroe), but Low Moor was the club's self-reported name.

History
The club was founded in 1879 and had reported matches as early as September 1880.  The same year Clitheroe F.C. was founded in the same town, which instantly made it difficult for either club to become competitive on the national, or even local, stage; Low Moor suffered a 13-1 defeat to Bolton Wanderers in 1881.  The defeat came a month after the club's biggest win - a 5-1 home victory over Abbey Village FC of Withnell in the first round of the Lancashire Senior Cup.  

The club competed in the FA Cup three times during the 1880s.  It first entered in 1883-84, but lost 6-0 in the first round to Blackburn Park Road, all of the goals coming in the first half.  

The Moorites got a revenge of sorts the following year as the clubs were drawn together in the first round, at Park Road's ground; after a 3-3 draw, the Roadsters scratched, giving Low Moor a passage into the second round.  Low Moor then went out to Southport Central, amidst some controversy as there were claims that two of the Southport goals were offside, and the Moorites denied two legitimate scores "to the amazement of spectators and players".

The club's final entry was in 1885-86, losing heavily to Rossendale.

Although the club seems to have continued into the 1887-88 season, the last reported match for the club was a 0-0 draw at Burnley Union Stars in front of 200 people in December 1886.

References

Defunct football clubs in England
Defunct football clubs in Lancashire
Association football clubs disestablished in the 19th century